The 1848 Connecticut gubernatorial election was held on April 3, 1848. Incumbent Governor and Whig nominee Clark Bissell was re-elected, defeating former congressman and Democratic nominee George S. Catlin with 50.38% of the vote. 

This was the last such election in which the Whig Party won a majority of the popular vote. Their vote share would steadily decline over each of the next eight elections, ending with their last appearance in the 1856 Connecticut gubernatorial election. The Whigs would only win two more of these eight elections, by the votes of the state legislature. It was also the last appearance of the Liberty Party.

General election

Candidates
Major party candidates

Clark Bissell, Whig
George S. Catlin, Democratic

Minor party candidates

Francis Gillette, Liberty

Results

References

1848
Connecticut
Gubernatorial